The Marriage-Hater Matched is a comedy play by the English writer Thomas D'Urfey. It was first staged by the United Company at the Theatre Royal, Drury Lane in January 1692. The original cast included John Bowman as  Brainless, William Mountfort as Sir Philip Freewit, Samuel Sandford as Limber, John Hodgson as  Darewell, Anthony Leigh as Myn Here Van Grin, George Bright as Bias, Thomas Doggett as Solon, William Bowen as Callow, Colley Cibber as Splutter, Elizabeth Barry as  Lady Subtle, Katherine Corey as Lady Bumfiddle, Anne Bracegirdle as Phoebe, Charlotte Butler as La Pupsey and Abigail Lawson as Margery.

References

Bibliography
 Van Lennep, W. The London Stage, 1660-1800: Volume One, 1660-1700. Southern Illinois University Press, 1960.

1692 plays
West End plays
Plays by Thomas d'Urfey
Restoration comedy